A crime boss, also known as a crime lord, Don, gang lord, gang boss, mob boss, kingpin, godfather, crime mentor or criminal mastermind, is a person in charge of a criminal organization.

Description
A crime boss typically has absolute or nearly absolute control over the other members of the organization and is often greatly feared or respected for their cunning, strategy, and/or ruthlessness and willingness to take lives to exert their influence and profits from the criminal endeavors in which the organization engages.

Some groups may only have as little as two ranks (a crime boss and their soldiers). Other groups have a more complex, structured organization with many ranks, and structure may vary with cultural background. Organized crime enterprises originating in Sicily differ in structure from those in mainland Italy. American groups may be structured differently from their European counterparts and Latino and African American gangs often have structures that vary from European gangs. The size of the criminal organization is also important, as regional or national gangs have much more complex hierarchies.

Italian Mafia

The boss in the Sicilian and Italian-American Mafia is the head of the crime family and the top decision maker. Only the boss, underboss or consigliere can initiate an associate into the family, allowing them to become a made man. The boss can promote or demote family members at will, and has the sole power to sanction murders inside and outside the family. If the boss is incarcerated or incapacitated, he usually retains the title of "boss" but may appoint an acting boss who is responsible for running the crime family in his stead or on a more daily basis. In addition to "boss" and "acting boss", some families have at times officially or unofficially utilized the positions of front boss and street boss. A "front boss" is generally put into place to act ostensibly as the boss while drawing police attention away from the actual official boss operating behind the scenes. A "street boss" is often informally appointed or regarded by the official boss or by subordinates as the "hands-on", street-level, actively engaged proxy or stand-in for the official boss, usually coordinating, controlling, and managing street operations on the behalf of an official boss who prefers to stay behind the scenes (either by choice or to avoid police scrutiny). "Street bosses" are often particularly influential or powerful caporegimes or underbosses, and the term is sometimes used interchangeably with "acting boss" or "front boss" depending on the circumstances. When a boss dies, the crime family members choose a new boss from inside the organization.

The typical structure within the Mafia in Sicily and America is usually as follows:

The highest body to decide on inter-family issues is the Commission (see also Sicilian Mafia Commission).
 Underboss – Also known as the "" in some criminal organizations, this individual is the second-in-command. He is responsible for ensuring that profits from criminal enterprises flow up to the boss, and generally oversees the selection of the caporegime(s) and soldier(s) to carry out murders. The underboss may take control of the crime family after the boss's death. He keeps this position until a new boss is chosen, which in some cases was the underboss.
 Consigliere – Also known as an advisor or "right-hand man", this person is a counselor to the boss of a crime family. The boss, underboss, and consigliere constitute the "Administration". The consigliere is third ranked in the hierarchy but generally does not have capos or soldiers working directly for him. Like the boss, there is usually only one consigliere per criminal organization.
 Caporegime – Also known as a captain, skipper, capo, or "crew chief", the caporegime was originally known as a "" (captain of ten) because he oversaw only 10 soldiers. In more recent times, the caporegime may oversee as many soldiers as he can efficiently control. Each caporegime reports directly to the underboss, who gives him the permission to perform criminal activities. If the family decides to murder someone, the underboss normally asks a caporegime to carry out the order. The caporegime runs the day-to-day operations of his crew. The caporegime's soldiers give part of their earnings to him, and then he gives a share to the underboss. A caporegime can recommend to the underboss or boss that a recruit be allowed to join his crew as a mob associate.
 Soldato – Also known as a sgarrista, soldier, "button man", "made man", "wiseguy" or "goodfella", this is the lowest level of mobster or gangster. A "soldier" must have taken the omertà (oath of silence), and in some organizations must have killed a person to be considered "made". A  is a low-level soldier, usually someone who does the day-to-day work of threatening, beating, and intimidating others.
 Associate – Also known as a "" (man of honor), an associate is a person who is not a soldier in a crime family, but works for them and shares in the execution of and profits from the criminal enterprise. In Italian criminal organizations, "associates" are usually affiliates of the criminal organization who are not of Italian descent, or affiliates and candidates of Italian descent who have not yet been "made" or inducted into the Mafia and thus have not yet been promoted to the position of "soldato" or "soldier".

A boss will typically put up layers of insulation between himself and his men to hinder police efforts to connect his orders to him. Whenever he issues orders, he does so either to his underboss, consigliere or capos. The orders are then passed down the line to the soldiers. This makes it difficult under most circumstances for the police to directly implicate a boss in a crime, since he almost never directly gives orders to the soldiers.

Mr. Big
The term Mr. Big is used within the underworld, and additionally during media reportings of persons associated with criminal activities, to refer to a leader of a body of persons functioning in the capacities of roles within organised crime. Sometimes bosses of the so-called gangland are referred to as being Mr Big, as for example when he could not be named for legal reasons. The term implicitly indicates a degree of a possession of a higher intelligence of an individual.

The term especially indicates the existence of involvement in what is known as big-time crime, which would include for example armed robbery, and the more organised aspects of careers within crime.

A 1945 dictionary of criminal slang in the U.S. lists Big Brains as "a gang-leader", but not Mr Big.

References

 
Crime
Organized crime terminology